Mazreku (archaic forms: Masarecu, Masareccu, Meserechus, Mânzaraku, Mazaraki or Mazarek) is an Albanian tribe or fis from the Dukagjin highlands. Historically they were one of the most widespread tribes, and placenames related to them are found throughout Albania: examples include Mazrek of Shkodër, or Mazrek in Tiranë. 
As a surname it may refer to:
Mazarek (vojvoda), Albanian nobleman and general in Serbia in the 15th century
Pjetër Mazreku, Albanian prelate of the Roman Catholic Church in the 17th century
Matija Mazarek, priest in the Ottoman Empire in the 18th century
Blerim Mazreku (born 1981), Kosovan basketball player
Gafur Mazreku, Albanian politician, late 20th century
Pjetër Mazreku ( 1624–1642), Roman Catholic bishop
Luan and Bekim Mazreku, Kosovan soldiers in 1998
Kostandin Kastrioti Mazreku, Great-grandfather of the Albanian national hero, Skanderbeg.

See also 

Shala (tribe)
Shoshi (tribe)
Shllaku (tribe)
Dushmani (tribe)
Toplana (tribe)

References

Tribes of Albania